Rosario del Carmen Vargas Sarasqueta (born 9 August 2002) is a Panamanian footballer who plays as a right-back for Spanish Primera Federación club Valencia CF B and the Panama women's national team. She is nicknamed Rosi.

Early life
Vargas was born in Panama City.

Club career
Vargas has played for Deportivo Saprissa in Costa Rica and for the Madrid CFF youth team and the Valencia CF reserve team in Spain.

International career
Vargas made her senior debut for Panama on 11 April 2021 in a 0–7 friendly away loss to Japan.

References

External links
Rosario Vargas at BDFútbol

2002 births
Living people
Sportspeople from Panama City
Panamanian women's footballers
Women's association football fullbacks
Deportivo Saprissa players
Madrid CFF players
Valencia CF Femenino players
Segunda Federación (women) players
Panama women's international footballers
Panamanian expatriate women's footballers
Panamanian expatriate sportspeople in Costa Rica
Expatriate women's footballers in Costa Rica
Panamanian expatriate sportspeople in Spain
Expatriate women's footballers in Spain
Rayo Vallecano Femenino players
Primera Federación (women) players